Peneroplidae is a family of foraminifera in the superfamily Soritacea.

References

External links 
 

 
 Peneroplidae at the World Register of Marine Species (WoRMS)

Tubothalamea
Foraminifera families